The Verse of Wilāya refers to verse 5:55 of the Quran, the central religious text of Islam. In Sunni Islam,  in this verse means friendship and support, whereas Shia Muslims interpret it as spiritual authority because of its exclusivity.

The first two authorities listed in this verse are God and the Islamic prophet Muhammad. In some Sunni sources, the third authority includes all believers, whereas Shia sources identify the third authority in this verse as Muhammad's cousin and son-in-law, Ali, referring to the occasion of its revelation. In Shia Islam, this verse thus signifies the spiritual authority of Ali over believers, after God and Muhammad, and supports his (usurped) right to succeed Muhammad. Other Sunni sources link this verse to Ali but reject any Shia implications.

The Arabic word  can mean guardian, friend, helper, or master.

In a political sense,  refers to authority and power, as personified by the leader of Muslim community after Muhammad, a reference to the Quranic term . For Sunnis,  specifically refers to state-building. For Shias, however,  primarily denotes the spiritual authority of the Shia Imams (and the prophets in their capacity as Imams). They are viewed as both master and friend in a believer's spiritual journey towards enlightenment. In contrast, prophets are concerned with the outward aspects of religion, namely, religious laws and ordinances. As such, the term  is applied to Shia Imams in Shia Islam and to Sufi Sheikhs in Sufism. Particularly in Sufism,  denotes God's elect.

Verse of Wilaya
Verse 5:55 of the Quran, known in Shia as the Verse of Wilaya, is translated by The Study Quran as

Landolt and the Shia Tabatabai give similar translations, though the Sunni Abdullah Yusuf Ali translate this verse as, "Your (real) friends are (no less than) Allah, His Messenger, and the believers---those who establish prayers and pay  and they bow down humbly (in worship)."

Occasion of the revelation

Jewish tribes 
Verse 5:55 was revealed in Medina. The Sunni Ibn Kathir and al-Kashani suggest that the verse was revealed after Ubada ibn al-Samit broke his ties with the Jewish clans and pledged his allegiance solely to Muhammad. Alternatively, the Sunni exegeses Tafsir al-Jalalayn and Asbab nuzul al-Qur'an consider this verse a response to some companions who complained about social ostracization by some Jewish tribes. The Sunni Ibn al-Kalbi writes that the verse was revealed when Abd Allah ibn Salam and some others converted to Islam and the Jewish tribes subsequently revoked their contract of clientage.

Ali 
In contrast, Shia and some Sunni commentators, including the early influential Ibn Abbas and Mujahid, consider this verse a specific reference to Ali. Such reports are included in the works of the Shia al-Mufid and the Sunni al-Baydawi, Ibn Kathir, al-Tabari, al-Zamakhshari, al-Wahidi, al-Razi, Ahmad al-Tabari, and al-Suyuti.

In these reports, verse 5:55 is connected to when Ali gave away his ring to a beggar while he was bowing in worship. Al-Tabari narrates a tradition to this effect from the Shia Imam al-Baqir but also includes a contradictory report in which al-Baqir explicitly denies any specific link to Ali. The attribution of this anti-Shia report to al-Baqir may also suggest some early debates about the status of al-Baqir as a Shia Imam. A minority of traditions link verse 5:55 to Abu Bakr.

Nasr et al. suggest that the frequent association of this verse with Ali in early Sunni sources strongly support its authenticity. In particular, the Sunni Ahmad al-Tabari includes the following detailed account on the authority of Abu Dharr, a companion of Muhammad.

Exegesis

For the Sunni al-Tabari, 'believers who give alms while bowing down in prayer' describes believers in general, whereas the Sunni al-Razi and al-Zamakhshari view them as sincere believers who are untainted by hypocrisy. The verse may also signal that one should perform these religious deeds in a state of humility, according to these two authors.

Debate about Ali 
For the Shia,  in this verse is interpreted as spiritual authority. Verse 5:55 thus describes Ali as the rightful authority over the believers, after God and Muhammad, and signifies his right to succeed Muhammad as the spiritual and political leader of the Muslim community. The hadith literature, consensus among scholars, and the occasion of the revelation are cited in Shia sources to support this interpretation. Verse 5:55 might be the most frequently cited verse by the Shia in support of Ali's rights.

Alternatively, those Sunni authors who acknowledge a link between this verse and Ali reject any Shia implications. For the Sunni al-Zamakhshari, the verse encourages Muslims to emulate Ali, who did not delay charity even until the end of his prayer. On the other hand, the Sunni Ibn Kathir questions the authenticity of the related hadiths.

Extent of  
Similarly, the Sunni al-Razi denies that  in this verse is anything more than friendship or mutual support. As such,  in this verse has a different significance than mere friendship. The  in this verse, they argue, is similar to that in verse 33:6, "The prophet has a greater claim on the faithful that they have on themselves."

Singular and plural forms 
Yet 'those' in the verse suggests otherwise. In response, the Shia al-Tusi lists other instances in the Quran where the plural form is used but a single person is meant, including verse 3:168 about Abd Allah ibn Ubayy. Alternatively, Shah-Kazemi is of the view that 'those who believe' in this verse are symbolized by Ali, referring to the prophetic hadith that described Ali as "faith, in its entirety." In his view, the authority in this verse is limited to God, Muhammad, Ali, and those believers who reach the rank of sainthood, regardless of their religion.

See also

Hadith of Warning
 Verse of Obedience
 Verse of Ikmal al-Din 
 Verse of Mawadda 
 Verse of Purification
 Ghadir Khumm

References

Sources

Further reading 
 .
 .
 .
 .
 .
 ..

 .
 .
 

Quranic verses
Shia Islam
Sunni Islam
Imamate